The Dorothea Dix Psychiatric Center is a psychiatric hospital operated by the state of Maine.  It is located at 656 State Street in Bangor, and was previously known as the Eastern Maine Insane Asylum and the Bangor Mental Health Institute.  It was established in 1895, and the main building on its campus is listed on the National Register of Historic Places.

Services and coverage area
The Dorothea Dix Psychiatric Center provides inpatient and outpatient care to the state's severest mentally ill in an area covering the eastern two-thirds of the state.  It has 51 beds, and provides its services to both voluntary and involuntary (court-committed) patients.  Its operations are governed by state legislation, and are overseen by the state's Department of Health and Human Services.

History
Maine's first psychiatric hospital was the Maine Insane Hospital, established in Augusta in 1835.  That facility was repeatedly enlarged, until 1889, when it was determined to no longer be feasible to expand it further.  The state appointed a committee to identify a location for a second facility, resulting in the selection of this location.  The centerpiece of the campus is a sprawling, connected multi-building complex, at whose center is the hospital's first building, designed by the noted Portland architect John Calvin Stevens and completed in 1897.  The wings, which were designed by Bangor architect George Coombs, were added in 1899–1901, when the facility formally opened its doors. The hospital continued to grow over the course of the 20th century, generally according to the principles of the Kirkbride Plan for the design and organization of mental hospitals.  The main building was listed on the National Register of Historic Places in 1987; it is one of the state's largest public buildings.

When founded, it was known as the Eastern Maine Insane Hospital.  Its name was changed in 1913 to Bangor State Hospital, and then to Bangor Mental Health Institute.  In 2005 it was renamed the Dorothea Dix Psychiatric Center, in honor of Dorothea Dix, a pioneering 19th-century advocate for the improved treatment of the mentally ill.

Campus
The center's campus is located on Bangor's east side, between State Street (United States Route 2) and Mount Hope Avenue, with Saxl Park on its west side.  In addition to the sprawling main building, the campus includes the Tubercular Center, Hedin Hall, the Pre-Release center, a maintenance building, and Pooler Pavilion.

See also
National Register of Historic Places listings in Penobscot County, Maine

References

Hospital buildings on the National Register of Historic Places in Maine
Buildings and structures completed in 1896
Buildings and structures in Bangor, Maine
Psychiatric hospitals in Maine
National Register of Historic Places in Bangor, Maine
1896 establishments in Maine